Kráľovce is a village and municipality in Košice-okolie District in the Kosice Region of eastern Slovakia. Nearby flows the Torysa River.

History
In historical records the village was first mentioned in 1388.

Historical names:
 1388 – Kyslapuspatak
 1427 – Kys-Lapispatak
 1488 – Király népi
 1630 – Király népe
 1773 – Kraloweze
 1920 – Kráľovce

Geography
It has a population of about 1040 people.

Civic amenities
 Primary school
 Kindergarten
 Church: Greek Catholic church
 Health center
 Pharmacy
 Kráľovce post office near Košice
 Football pitch

References

External links

  

Villages and municipalities in Košice-okolie District